Hannes Rainer (born 14 March 1954) is an Austrian sports shooter. He competed in the mixed 50 metre rifle prone event at the 1980 Summer Olympics.

References

1954 births
Living people
Austrian male sport shooters
Olympic shooters of Austria
Shooters at the 1980 Summer Olympics
People from Liezen District
Sportspeople from Styria
20th-century Austrian people